The Mount Rogers Cluster is a region recognized by The Wilderness Society for its unique high elevation mountains, vistas, trout streams and wildlife habitat.  The heart of the region is Mount Rogers, the highest mountain in Virginia.  The area extends over  the Mount Rogers National Recreation Area and into part of the Cherokee National Forest.

With elevations above 5000 feet, the area is unlike any other in Virginia.  The high elevations have a
Canadian-type climate with a spruce-fir remnant forest and high timbered ridges opening to grassy alpine meadows similar to The Montana Big Sky country.  Many trails offer a summer escape from nearby humid lowlands.

Description
The Mount Rogers Wilderness Cluster contains  wilderness areas, a National Scenic Area and wildlands recognized by the Wilderness Society as "Mountain Treasures", areas that are worthy of protection from logging and road construction. All of the areas are at least partially within the Mount Rogers National Recreation Area with some extending into the Cherokee National Forest in Tennessee.

The areas in the cluster are:
Wilderness Areas
Lewis Fork Wilderness
Little Wilson Creek Wilderness
Raccoon Branch Wilderness
Little Dry Run Wilderness
Scenic Area
Seng Mountain National Scenic Area
Wildareas recognized by the Wilderness Society as "Mountain Treasures"
Devil's Den-Ewing Mountain
Horse Heaven (conservation area)
Little Dry Run Wilderness Addition
Shaw Gap
Feathercamp
Mount Rogers Crest Zone
Whitetop Mountain (conservation area)
Whitetop Laurel
Rogers Ridge
London Bridge Branch
Beaverdam Creek (conservation area)

Location and access
The cluster can be accessed from the south and east by US 58, on the north from Va 16 on the north, and on the east Va 94.  A visitor center on Va 16 has maps and information about the area.  The nearest towns are Marion, 7 miles north of the visitor center, and Damascus, near the Virginia-Tennessee border.

Roads and trails are given on National Geographic Maps 786 (Mount Rogers)., Map 318 (Mount Rogers High Country) and Map 783 (South Holston and Watauga Lakes). A great variety of information, including topographic maps, aerial views, satellite data and weather information, is obtained by selecting the link with the wild land's coordinates  in the upper right of this page.

Biological significance
With elevations ranging from 2000 feet to 5700 feet, the area offers a contrast of deep forested areas and high mountain meadows kept open by burning, cattle grazing and feral ponies.   There are nearly 160 different species of birds, as well as rare salamanders including the golden pygmy salamander.

Geologic history

The bedrock beneath Mt Rogers is different from most other rocks in Virginia.  The formation is divided into three sections—the oldest is made of basalt lava flows, some rhyolite, volcanic ash and sandstone indicating volcanic formation; the second oldest, about half of the total thickness, is made mainly of rhyolite with some basalt and sediments; and the youngest is mainly composed of sediments with some basalt and rhyolite.  There are several explanations for the origins of these rocks with some geologists claiming that the rocks were formed elsewhere and transported along fault lines.

Most of the area drains into the New River, the southernmost river on the American continent that flows from south to north cutting across the Appalachians into the Gulf of Mexico by way of the Ohio and Mississippi Rivers.  Some geologists have the New River as a successor to a larger river that drained the entire area to the west and east of Mount Rogers.  With time, the Atlantic Ocean opened to create an Atlantic drainage capturing some of the headwaters of the New River's predecessor by a process known as stream capture.

See also
Volcanic History of the Mount Rogers Area

Other clusters
Other clusters of the Wilderness Society's "Mountain Treasures" in the Jefferson National Forest (north to south):

Glenwood Cluster
Craig Creek Cluster
Barbours Creek-Shawvers Run Cluster
Sinking Creek Valley Cluster
Mountain Lake Wilderness Cluster
Angels Rest Cluster
Walker Mountain Cluster
Kimberling Creek Cluster
Garden Mountain Cluster
Clinch Ranger District Cluster

References

Further reading
 Stephenson, Steven L., A Natural History of the Central Appalachians, 2013, West Virginia University Press, West Virginia, .
 Davis, Donald Edward, Where There Are Mountains, An Environmental History of the Southern Appalachians, 2000, University of Georgia Press, Athens, Georgia. .

External links
 George Washington and Jefferson National Forest
 Mount Rogers National Recreation Area App
 Mount Rogers National Recreation Area
 Cherokee National Forest
 Wilderness Society
 Appalachian Trail
 Geology of Virginia
 Mount Rogers wildlife action plan
 Southern Appalachian Spruce Restoration
 Blue Ridge Discovery Center

Protected areas of Virginia